Shiney Row is a village in Houghton-le-Spring, Tyne and Wear, England. One of the most notable people who was born in Shiney Row is Sir George Elliot, 1st Baronet, owner of the factory that produced the first Transatlantic telegraph cable.

References

City of Sunderland suburbs